Iron Cross (abbreviated as IC) is a rock band in Myanmar formed by lead guitarist Saw Bwe Hmu. The current line up consists of Chit San Maung (lead guitarist ကရင်လူမျိုး), Khin Maung Thant (bass guitarist), Banyar Naing (keyboards player), and Kha Yan (drummer). Iron Cross played too many studio albums of Myanmar's singers. However, Lay Phyu, Myo Gyi, Ah Nge and Y Wine are long time relationships with IC who also as part with them. All the four singers are lead vocal of IC's live performance and IC always performs with them.

Name 
Although the band was initially was named 'Holy Cross', they later changed the name to 'Iron Cross' to draw a wider audience.

The band and its symbol 
The symbol of the band's logo depicts an eagle and a metal cross, and is in a way, similar to the Parteiadler used as Nazi party emblems. As a result, the international community in the past, kept an eye on the band. But lead guitarist Chit San Maung said that the band had not known the symbol was a taboo.

History

Earlier periods 
The band was formed in 1990. Saw Bwe Hmu disbanded his former band Symphony. After a few months had passed, he formed Iron Cross with his guitar student Chit San Maung, keyboard player Banyar Naing who from Moe Thout Pan band, the former New Waves band players; bassist Khin Maung Thant and drummer Kha Yan. Early period, Saw Bwe Hmu allows his all members to play as a session player. But his best friend Dr. Ko Ko Lwin who is currently manager of IC, talk all members not to play session anymore at their meeting. In 1992, Lay Phyu came to Yangon from Taunggyi to record his first album and then he played it with IC. Emergence of Lay Phyu made the band to success and they all rose to fame. Later, Lay Phyu's brother Ah Nge joined and then Y Wine. Myo Gyi, the guitar student of Chit San Maung who is the last one joined to IC. All the four are going as solo career with IC but at the live show performance, they all perform together.

2008 to present 
In spite of a local band, they also toured some countries like United states, Japan, South Korea, Singapore and a few European countries to entertain the Burmese community living there, or to fundraise  for charities.

In 2008, they participated in a big event held in Japan, performing with different bands of ASEAN countries. In the same year after Cyclone Nargis, they staged a show, which entertained five thousand people, the largest number that has ever come to a music show till 2008. $100,000 could be fundraised for the victims of the storm-hit areas.

In 2010, a live concert was held at Thuwunna National Indoor Stadium to celebrate their 20th anniversary.

In 2015, they raised funds for Aung San Suu Kyi's Education Foundation, staging a music performance.

Band members 
 Current members
 Lead guitar – Chit San Maung (1989–present)
 Bass guitar – Khin Maung Thant (1991–present)
 Keyboard – Banyar Naing (1991–present)
 Drums – Kha Yan (1991–present)
Additional members
 Lead vocals, backing vocals, percussion – Lay Phyu, Ah Nge, Myo Gyi, Y Wine
 Manager – Dr. Ko Ko Lwin

Former members
 Saw Bwe Hmu – lead guitar (1989–1994 his death)

References 

Burmese musical groups
Musical groups established in 1989